Vicente Salgado y Garrucho (born 20 April 1936 Manila – 9 April 2005) was a Filipino Roman Catholic bishop and the second Bishop of Romblon succeeding His Most Reverend Nicolas M. Mondejar in 1988.

Life
Vicente Salgado y Garrucho received on 23 December 1961, the priestly ordination. On 30 May 1988, he was appointed by Pope John Paul II Bishop of Romblon. The Apostolic Nuncio to the Philippines, Bruno Torpigliani, consecrated him on 25 July of the same year. Co-consecrators were Alberto Jover Piamonte, archbishop of Jaro and Antonio Yapsutco Fortich, Bishop of Bacolod. On 30 January 1997 the Pope accepted his age-related resignation.

Death
At the age of 69 years he died on 9 April 2005.

See also
Narciso Villaver Abellana
Nicolas M. Mondejar
Bishop of Romblon
Roman Catholic Diocese of Romblon

References

Roman Catholic bishops of Romblon
20th-century Roman Catholic bishops in the Philippines
People from Bacolod
1936 births
2005 deaths